The Sword of Goujian is a tin bronze sword, renowned for its unusual sharpness, intricate design and resistance to tarnish rarely seen in artifacts of similar age. The sword is generally attributed to Goujian, one of the last kings of Yue during the Spring and Autumn period. 

In 1965, the sword was found in an ancient tomb in Hubei. It is currently in the possession of the Hubei Provincial Museum. In 1994, the sword was damaged by a worker while on loan to Singapore, since then China has forbidden the sword to be exhibited abroad.

Discovery 
In 1965, while an archaeological survey was being performed along the second main aqueduct of the Zhang River Reservoir in Jingzhou, Hubei, a series of ancient tombs were discovered in Jiangling County. A dig started in the middle of October 1965, ending in January 1966, eventually revealing more than fifty ancient tombs of the Chu State.

More than 2,000 artifacts were recovered from the sites, including an ornate bronze sword, found inside a casket together with a human skeleton. The casket was discovered in December 1965, at Wangshan site #1,  from the ruins of Ying, currently called Jinancheng ), an ancient capital of Chu.

The sword was found sheathed in a wooden scabbard finished in black lacquer. The scabbard had an almost air-tight fit with the sword body. Unsheathing the sword revealed an untarnished blade, despite the tomb being soaked in underground water for over 2,000 years.

Identification 

On one side of the blade, two columns of text are visible. Eight characters are written in an ancient script, now known as Bird-worm seal script (literally "birds and worms characters", owing to the intricate decorations of the defining strokes), a variant of seal script. Initial analysis of the text deciphered six of the characters, "King of Yue" (越王) and "made this sword for [his] personal use" (自作用劍). The remaining two characters were assumed to be the name of the particular King of Yue.

From the sword's origin in 510 BC to the kingdom's demise at the hands of the Chu in 334 BC, nine kings ruled Yue, including Goujian, Lu Cheng, Bu Shou, and Zhu Gou. The identity of the king named in the sword inscription sparked debate among archeologists and Chinese language scholars. The discussion was carried out mostly via letter, and involved famous scholars such as Guo Moruo. After more than two months, the experts  started to form a consensus that the original owner of the sword was Goujian (勾踐), the King of Yue made famous by his perseverance in time of hardship.

Construction 
The sword weighs . In addition to the repeating dark rhombi pattern on both sides of the blade, there are decorations of blue crystals and turquoise. The grip of the sword is bound by silk, while the pommel is composed of eleven concentric circles.

Chemical composition 
The Sword of Goujian still has a sharp blade and shows no signs of tarnish. To understand why, scientists at Fudan University and CAS used modern equipment to determine the chemical composition of the sword, as shown in the table below.

Amount of elements by percentage 

The body of the blade is mainly made of copper, making it more pliant and less likely to shatter; the edges have more tin content, making them harder and capable of retaining a sharper edge; the sulfur decreases the chance of tarnish in the patterns.

It is likely that the chemical composition, along with the almost air-tight scabbard, led to the exceptional state of preservation.

Damage 
While on loan to Singapore for display as part of a cultural exchange exhibition in 1994, a worker accidentally bumped the sword against the case, resulting in a  crack on the sword. Since then, China has not allowed the sword to be taken out of the country, and in 2013 officially placed the sword onto the list of Chinese cultural relics forbidden to be exhibited abroad.

See also 
Bell metal
Spear of Fuchai, the spear used by Goujian's arch-rival, King Fuchai of Wu
Weapons and armor in Chinese mythology

References

External links 
  Sina.com's collection of stories

Archaeological artifacts of China
Ancient Chinese swords
Yue (state)
1965 archaeological discoveries
Individual weapons